The 1976 Virginia Slims of Boston  was a women's tennis tournament played on indoor carpet courts at the Boston University Walter Brown Arena  in Boston, Massachusetts in the United States that was part of the 1976 Virginia Slims World Championship Series. It was the fourth edition of the tournament and was held from March 22 through March 28, 1976. Evonne Goolagong Cawley won the singles title and earned $15,000 first-prize money.

Finals

Singles
 Evonne Goolagong Cawley defeated  Virginia Wade 6–2, 6–0

Doubles
 Mona Schallau /  Ann Kiyomura defeated  Rosemary Casals /  Françoise Dürr 3–6, 6–1, 7–5

References

External links
 Women's Tennis Association (WTA) tournament details

Virginia Slims of Boston
Virginia Slims of Boston
Virginia
Virginia